Ade Jantra Lukmana (born 3 January 1990) is an Indonesian professional footballer who plays as a attacking midfielder for Liga 2 club Bekasi City.

Club career 
In January 2015, he moved to Pusamania Borneo.

Honours

Club
Persita Tangerang U-21
 Indonesia Super League U-21 runner-up: 2008-09
Persita Tangerang
 Liga 2 runner-up: 2019

References

External links 
 Ade Jantra at Soccerway
 Ade Jantra at Liga Indonesia

1990 births
Living people
Indonesian footballers
People from Tangerang
Persita Tangerang players
Borneo F.C. players
Indonesian Premier Division players
Liga 1 (Indonesia) players
Sportspeople from Banten
Association football midfielders